"Stranger in a Strange Land" is a song by the English heavy metal band Iron Maiden, released as the second single from their sixth studio album, Somewhere in Time (1986). The song is unrelated to Robert A. Heinlein's novel by the same name.

Synopsis 
The lyrics are about an Arctic explorer who dies and is frozen in the ice. After a hundred years his body is found preserved by other people exploring there. Adrian Smith was inspired to write about this song after talking to an explorer who had a similar experience of discovering a frozen body.

The guitar solo in "Stranger in a Strange Land" is played by Smith. In a 2020 interview with eonmusic, the guitarist said that it was one of the first Iron Maiden songs that gave him "space to play in", citing its mid-paced tempo as the reason why; "a lot of the Maiden stuff up until then had been very fast, and aggressive, and heavy, but that actually allowed me a little bit of space to stretch out a bit", he said.

The song is one of only five Iron Maiden songs to fade out; the others being "The Prophecy" from Seventh Son of a Seventh Son, "Hell on Earth" from Senjutsu, "Women in Uniform", a single included on some pressings of Killers, and "Kill Me Ce Soir", a 1990 B-side. The lyrics "brave new world" were also present in Iron Maiden's 2000 studio release, Brave New World.

Cover details 
Eddie's appearance on the single cover is an homage to the Clint Eastwood character "Man with No Name", although it can also be seen as a mixture of Rick Deckard from Blade Runner and the "Man with No Name".
This version of Eddie would later be used in the Camp Chaos music video for "Run to the Hills".
 In the top-right corner of the cover (slightly right of Eddie's lit match), the time on the clock appears as "11:58". This is a reference to an earlier Iron Maiden single, "2 Minutes to Midnight".
 Several cards can be seen falling from the table. One (orange background, next to red-coloured card) contains a picture of the Grim Reaper, like that on "The Trooper" cover.
 Just under one of the stacks of cards, on the edge of the table, Derek Riggs' signature can be seen.
 In the music video for a later song, "The Angel and the Gambler" (from Virtual XI), then-singer Blaze Bayley is dressed up like this Eddie.

B-sides 
The B-sides to this single, "That Girl" and "Juanita", were both played during The Entire Population of Hackney secret gig on 19 December 1985, with Adrian Smith on vocals. This is probably where the idea came from to play them as B-sides, especially with Adrian's large presence on this single and the Somewhere in Time album.

"That Girl" was written by Merv Goldsworthy, Pete Jupp and Andy Barnett in an early line-up of the band FM and was one of the demo tracks which secured them a record deal with CBS in 1984. The song was eventually released by both Iron Maiden and FM in 1986. By then the brothers Steve and Chris Overland had joined FM and some parts of the original song (mainly choruses) had been rewritten for its inclusion on FM's debut album Indiscreet, released just three weeks prior to Iron Maiden's Somewhere In Time which featured a cover of the original arrangement. On this Iron Maiden version the first guitar solo is played by Dave Murray, while the ending guitar solo is played by Adrian Smith.

"Juanita" was originally played by Barnett's band, Marshall Fury, in the early 1980s, and it was written by Steve Barnacle and Derek O'Neil. Marshall Fury never recorded a studio version of the song.

Track listing 
'7" single

12" single

Personnel 
Personnel as listed in the album's liner notes are:
 Bruce Dickinson – lead vocals
 Dave Murray – synthesized guitar
 Adrian Smith – synthesized guitar
 Steve Harris – bass guitar
 Nicko McBrain – drums
Production
Martin Birch – producer, engineer, mixing
Derek Riggs – cover illustration
Ross Halfin – photography

Chart performance

Notes

References 

1986 singles
1986 songs
Arctic in fiction
Capitol Records singles
EMI Records singles
Iron Maiden songs
Song recordings produced by Martin Birch
Songs based on actual events
Songs inspired by deaths
Songs written by Adrian Smith